The Statutes of Drivasto were the highest form of expression of self-government in the Albanian village of Drisht during the Middle Ages. Titled "Statuta et Ordinationes Capituli Ecclesiae Cathedralis Drivastensis", they were unique for the fact that the power of city governance was concentrated in the hands of the bishop of the Drisht Cathedral.

References

Shkodër County